Living on the Edge of Time is the second studio album by French electro house musician Yuksek. It was released in July 2011 under Ultra Records.

Track list

References

2011 albums
Ultra Records albums
Yuksek albums